Phan Văn Trường (1876–1933) was an early 20th century Vietnamese nationalist, the first Juris Doctor of Vietnam and a key actor of cultural modernization in Vietnam in the decade 1920–1930. Along with his four compatriots Phan Châu Trinh, Nguyễn Tất Thành, Nguyễn An Ninh and Nguyễn Thế Truyền, Phan Văn Trường formed the group known as the Ngũ Long (Five Dragons, French: Cinq Dragons) during his stay in France from 1908 to 1925.

Phan Văn Trường was born on 25 September 1876 in Đông Ngạc commune, Từ Liêm district, Hà Nội, in a family of academics. From the young age, he was well known for his intelligence and being hardworking, he started by studying Chinese characters, then switched to studying Chữ quốc ngữ and the French language.

After graduating from the School of Interpretation in Hà Nội, Phan worked as an interpreter at the Bắc Kỳ Governor's Office. In 1908, he went to France to study law at the Sorbonne University, Paris, then defensed his doctoral thesis and practiced law, he became a Juris Doctor and the first lawyer of Vietnam.

In 1931, he went to Saigon and met Nguyễn An Ninh again with the intention of continuing the struggle against the French colonizers on the front of the public press. However, Phan's wish did not come true. In 1933, he returned to Hà Nội to visit his family. During his stay there, he suddenly fell ill and died at home on 23 April 1933.

References

1876 births
1933 deaths
People from Hanoi
Vietnamese nationalists
Vietnamese democracy activists
Vietnamese independence activists